Freyana is a genus of mites belonging to the family Freyanidae.

The species of this genus are found in Asia and Northern America.

Species:
 Freyana anatina (Koch, 1844) 
 Freyana anserina Megnin & Trouessart, 1884

References

Sarcoptiformes
Acari genera